Île du Lys, also known as Le Lys or Ile du Lise, is one of the Glorioso Islands, north-west of Madagascar.  It is administered by France.

Description
The island has a prominent sand hill and a saltwater lagoon.

Important Bird Area
The island has been identified as an Important Bird Area (IBA) by BirdLife International because it supports a very large colony of about 100,000 pairs of sooty terns, as well as 100 pairs of brown noddies. There are no resident landbirds.

References

Glorioso Islands
Uninhabited islands of France
Islands of the French Southern and Antarctic Lands
Disputed islands of Seychelles
Uninhabited islands of Seychelles
Uninhabited islands of Madagascar
Important Bird Areas of the Scattered Islands in the Indian Ocean
Disputed islands
Seabird colonies